Abdul Halim bin Haron is bodybuilder from Singapore who was inducted into the Singapore Sports Council's Hall of Fame for his impressive performance over the years. Starting his professional career in the welterweight category in the late 1990s, he won a bronze medal in the Asian Championship in 2000, and came out tops in the Singaporean national competitions a year later.

As there is a higher chance of winning medals in the lighter categories, he was asked to switch to the lower weight categories, a request which involved having to shed over 10 kilogrammes over just two years. His efforts allowed him to compete in the Busan 2002 Asian Games in the bantamweight category, and earned him a gold medal.

External links
Hall of Fame - Abdul Halim Haron

Living people
Singaporean bodybuilders
Asian Games medalists in bodybuilding
Bodybuilders at the 2002 Asian Games
Asian Games gold medalists for Singapore
Medalists at the 2002 Asian Games
Year of birth missing (living people)
Competitors at the 2001 World Games